Eric Abetz (born 25 January 1958) is a former Australian politician who was a Senator for Tasmania from 1994 to 2022, representing the Liberal Party. He was the Minister for Employment and the Leader of the Government in the Senate in the Abbott Government from 2013 to 2015. He previously also served as Special Minister of State in the Howard Government from 2001 to 2006 and as Minister for Fisheries, Forestry and Conservation from 2006 to 2007.

Born in Germany (in what was then West Germany), Abetz emigrated to Australia as a small child, when his father came to work for Tasmania's Hydro Electric Commission. He was educated at the University of Tasmania and was a barrister and solicitor before entering politics. He is a former national president of the Australian Liberal Students' Federation and was state president of the Tasmanian Liberals from 1990 to 1994.

Family and personal life
The youngest of six children, Abetz emigrated from Germany to Australia with his parents in 1961. His father, Walter Abetz, a radio technician who lost a leg fighting with the German army on the Russian Front, came to Australia to work for Tasmania's Hydro Electric Commission, which had advertised for skilled workers in German newspapers. Another one of the Abetz children is Peter Abetz, who was the Liberal member for Southern River in the Legislative Assembly of Western Australia from the 2008 state election until 2017. 

Eric Abetz's great uncle, Otto Abetz, was a Nazi SS officer, German ambassador to Vichy France, and a convicted war criminal. Eric's grandfather was Karl Abetz, a professor of forestry science, who joined the Nazi Party in 1933 and became general consultant of the Reich Forestry Office in 1942.

Abetz married Michelle Oates in 1991, and they had three children. His wife died of cancer in 2019. He is a Christian.

Studies
Abetz studied at Taroona High School, Hobart Matriculation College and the University of Tasmania, earning degrees in law and arts in 1981. He served as president of the University of Tasmania Liberal Club, and in 1980–1981, he became the first Tasmanian to become national president of the Australian Liberal Students' Federation, during which time he came into political conflict with Nick Sherry and Sue Mackay, both later to be Australian Labor Party senators.

Early political career: 1993–2007 in opposition and Government
He won preselection as a candidate for the Senate in the 1984 and 1993 elections but did not win a seat.  He was then chosen to fill the casual vacancy caused by the resignation of Brian Archer in 1994, and was elected in his own right at the subsequent 1998 election and re-elected in 2004, 2010 and 2016. Abetz was Parliamentary Secretary to the Minister for Defence 1998–2001 and was Special Minister of State from January 2001 until 2006.

He has served as Chairman of the Native Title and the Aboriginal and Torres Strait Islander Land Fund Committee and Chairman of the Senate Legal and Constitutional Affairs Legislation Committee. He also served as Chairman of the Attorney-General and Justice Government Members' Committee.

He was a member of a Parliamentary Delegation which visited France and Belgium in June and July 1997, and made an official visit to the United Kingdom in September 1999.

He was Minister for Forestry from a reshuffle of the Howard ministry in January 2006 until its defeat at the 2007 election.  He commenced his portfolio by attacking the Australian Greens and environmentalists in general as anti-Australian. He described the campaign against woodchipping as "akin to treason" and branded the Greens an "extreme left" party. This allowed him to position the government's priorities as mainstream issues which both major parties wanted action on.

Abetz is a member of the National Right faction of the Liberal Party.

Later political career: 2007–2022 in opposition and government

2009 OzCar affair
In mid-2009 Abetz was a central figure in the OzCar affair, which involved false allegations that Prime Minister Kevin Rudd and Treasurer Wayne Swan had improperly given favourable treatment to a car dealer, John Grant, who was a friend of the Prime Minister. At a Senate inquiry on 19 June, Abetz asked a series of questions of a Treasury official, Godwin Grech, who testified that he had a "recollection" that a member of Rudd's staff had sent him an email in February, asking that he provide preferential treatment to Grant. Abetz read out the text of what he said was an email, which purported to ask for preferential treatment for Grant. On 4 August 2009, Grech admitted that he had forged the email. Abetz then issued an apology, saying: "I am not only sorry to Malcolm Turnbull but to the Australian people and any anguish that may have been occasioned to Kevin Rudd and other people."

Eligibility to hold Senate office
On 30 July 2010, Tasmanian resident John Hawkins lodged an objection to Abetz's nomination for re-election, alleging that Abetz still held dual citizenship of both his birthplace, Germany, and Australia and thus was ineligible under Section 44 of the Constitution of Australia. Hawkins subsequently withdrew the petition to the High Court of Australia.

Minister under the Abbott government
In September 2013 Abetz was appointed Minister for Employment in the Abbott Government and oversaw the drafting of legislation to reestablish the Australian Building and Construction Commission, the establishment of a Registered Organisations Commission following the Craig Thomson Affair, and the launching of the Royal Commission into trade union governance and corruption and Fair Work Act Review. Abetz also designed and implemented the Government's Jobactive Employment Services Reforms.

In August 2014 Abetz received criticism from the media and politicians such as the Greens' Adam Bandt for making claims of a link between abortion and breast cancer when appearing on The Project.  He had been on The Project to discuss his association with the World Congress of Families.

It was reported in May 2015 that Abetz was quoted as saying of Joe de Bruyn, national president of the SDA, the largest private sector trade union in Australia, that "he is a role model of trade union officialdom. He is the type of official that gives trade unionism a good name." De Bruyn spent 36 years as National Secretary of the SDA, known for its close relationships with major employers such as Coles and Woolworths.  De Bruyn had also been known for his staunch and vocal opposition to same-sex marriage.

Dropped from ministry
Abetz was dropped from the First Turnbull Ministry upon the ascension of the Turnbull Government, with George Brandis succeeding Abetz as Leader of the Government in the Senate. In the three days where Abetz was Prime Minister Malcolm Turnbull's representative in the Senate Abetz said "The King is dead, long live the King" in reference to the leadership change.

Abetz is a Christian and a member of the Christian Reformed Churches of Australia. Throughout his political career he has been variously associated with conservative groups, including the Association of Christian Parent Controlled Schools, Salt Shakers, Focus on the Family, Lyons Forum, Endeavour Forum, Family Council of Victoria, Fatherhood Foundation, Australian Christian Lobby, Australian Family Association and Right to Life Australia. Abetz is an opponent of same-sex marriage, and in a 2015 interview on 2UE said arguments comparing discrimination against mixed-race couples to same-sex couples were "completely debunked by Justice Clarence Thomas, the negro American on the Supreme Court".

On 2017 when Cory Bernardi moved a motion to ban abortion on gender grounds Abetz was 1 of the 10 who voted Yes on the Motion. It was voted down with (10–36).

Abetz is a public opponent of same sex marriage, and was one of twelve senators who voted against what became the Marriage Amendment (Definition and Religious Freedoms) Act 2017.

During Senate debates regarding the Nuclear Fuel Cycle (Facilitation) Bill, presented by Senator Cory Bernardi in November 2017, Abetz strongly endorsed the prospect of nuclear power in Australia. He described nuclear power as "the very best source of energy production that science has to offer the world" and claimed that it offered "affordable and reliable energy, with no emissions at all."

2021 alleged "slut-shaming" comments

On 24 March 2021, two days after Tasmanian House of Assembly speaker Sue Hickey resigned from the Liberal Party to sit as an independent, Hickey accused Abetz in the House of making "slut-shaming" comments on Brittany Higgins, who allegedly had been raped by a male staffer in the Federal Parliament in Canberra. Hickey claimed that Abetz had told her at a citizenship ceremony in Hobart on 1 March:As for that Higgins girl, anybody so disgustingly drunk who would sleep with anybody could have slept with one of our spies and put the security of the nation at risk.Hickey also alleged that Abetz had told her "not to worry" about the separate allegation against federal Attorney-General Christian Porter that he had raped a woman in 1988, as "the woman is dead and the law will protect [Porter]". Abetz "categorically denied" making any of these comments and accused Hickey of "trying to destroy the [Liberal] party". Hickey responded to Abetz by accusing him of "grubby politics" and said that she stood by her statement.

Later on 24 March, Tasmanian Premier Peter Gutwein wrote to Prime Minister Scott Morrison, stating that Hickey had raised the matter of Abetz's comments with him weeks earlier and requested Morrison to "consider the matters raised".

Defeat at 2022 federal election
Since entering the Senate, Abetz was always placed first in Liberal Party preselection for Senate elections, which all but guaranteed him winning one of the six Senate seats normally available for the state.  On 8 May 2021, it was announced that, for the next federal election, he had been dropped to third place, substantially reducing his prospect of re-election. This ended up costing him his seat at the election in May 2022, as Jacqui Lambie Network candidate Tammy Tyrrell won the state's sixth Senate seat ahead of Abetz. As a result, his Senate term ended on 30 June 2022.

Vote No Republic
On 31 August 2022, the Australian Monarchist League announced Abetz as Campaign Director of the Vote No Republic campaign.

References

External links
 Summary of parliamentary voting for Senator Eric Abetz on TheyVoteForYou.org.au

1958 births
Living people
Abbott Government
Liberal Party of Australia members of the Parliament of Australia
Members of the Australian Senate
Members of the Australian Senate for Tasmania
German emigrants to Australia
People who lost German citizenship
Naturalised citizens of Australia
Recipients of the Centenary Medal
University of Tasmania alumni
Members of the Cabinet of Australia
Government ministers of Australia
Australian Protestants
21st-century Australian politicians
20th-century Australian politicians
Politicians from Stuttgart